Rey Geovani Vargas Roldán (born November 25, 1990) is a Mexican professional boxer. He is a world champion in two weight classes, having held the WBC featherweight title since July 2022 and the WBC super bantamweight title from February 2017 to August 2020.

Amateur career
Vargas won 7 national championships in Mexico as an amateur, as well as a gold medal in the 2009 Panamerican Championships. He competed in the 2009 World Championships but was defeated by Luke Campbell in the first round.

Professional career

Early career
Vargas debuted as a professional in May 2010. He won the IBF Youth title in his 11th fight. Vargas won 15 of his first 16 fights by way of knockout. The first fighter to go the distance with him since his second fight was Yuki Murai. In March 2014, Vargas was knocked down for the first time against Sylvester Lopez. Vargas went down in round 2 but won the bout after Lopez suffered an injury and was unable to continue. The two rematched on November of that same year, Vargas won the second fight with a round 8 TKO. Vargas went down once again in round 2 of an eight-round fight against Lucian González, after an overhand right. Vargas was able to survive and get the unanimous decision (78-73, 78–74, 77-75).

In June 2016, Vargas won a shut-out unanimous decision (120-108, 120–108, 120-108) over Alexis Kabore. With the win, Vargas became the mandatory challenger to the WBC's super bantamweight titlist, Hugo Ruiz. In September 2016, Vargas defeated former WBA super flyweight champion Alexander Muñoz with a 5th-round TKO. Muñoz went down four times until the referee finally stopped the contest.

WBC super bantamweight champion

Vargas vs. McDonnell
On 25 February 2017, he faced Gavin McDonnell for the vacant WBC super bantamweight title. The title fight took place in Hull, England. Vargas established control of the fight early on, using his length and head movement to keep the hometown fighter at bay, while landing short combinations. McDonnell attempted to rally back during the later rounds, but he was ultimately unable to turn the scorecards around. Vargas won a majority decision (117-111, 116–112, 114-114) to become a world champion.

Vargas vs. Rios
Vargas' first defense would come on the Cotto-Kamegai undercard at the StubHub Center, against Ronny Rios. Vargas was also able to out-box Rios, controlling the bout by fighting at range. Vargas won via unanimous decision (118-110, 118–110, 115-113). Vargas made a second defense against Oscar Negrete in another Miguel Cotto undercard, in this case his farewell bout against Sadam Ali. The match was in December 2017 at Madison Square Garden, and was televised on HBO. Vargas was cut twice by headbutts but used his length effectively to cruise to a wide unanimous decision (119-109, 119–109, 120-108).

Vargas vs. Negrete
Vargas made his second title defense against the WBC–NABF bantamweight champion Oscar Negrete, who moved up a weight class in order to challenge Vargas. The bout was scheduled as to co-main event to the Miguel Cotto and Sadam Ali WBO super welterweight title fight. It took place at the Madison Square Garden in New York City on 2 December 2017 and was broadcast by Showtime. On 24 November, Vargas' head trainer Ignacio Beristáin revealed it would be their last fight together, as they agreed to part ways afterwards. Vargas won the fight by a wide unanimous decision. Two of the judges scored the fight 119–109 for him, while the third judge scored it 120–108 in his favor. Vargas was cut above each eye, with one cut happening due to an accidental headbutt in the seventh round, while the second cut came about for the same reason in the eight round.

Vargas vs. Hovhannisyan
Vargas made his second title defense against the twice-defeated Azat Hovhannisyan on 12 May 2018, at the Turning Stone Resort Casino in Verona, New York. Hovhannisyan was ranked #9 by the WBC at super bantamweight. The fight was booked as the co-main event of a WBO super welterweight title fight, same as his previous defense, between Sadam Ali and Jaime Munguia. He won the fight by unanimous decision, with scores of 116–112, 118–110 and 117–111. Vargas was once again cut by headbutts, once in the eight and once in the twelfth round.

Vargas vs. Manzanilla
Vargas made his fourth title defense against the WBC Silver super bantamweight champion Franklin Manzanilla on 9 February 2019 at the Fantasy Springs Casino in Indio, California. It took place following a nine-month absence from the sport caused by a shoulder surgery, followed by a respiratory infection. Manzanilla was ranked #3 by the WBC at super bantamweight. The bout served as the co-main event to the DAZN broadcast card headlined by a junior lightweight title fight between Alberto Machado and Andrew Cancio. Vargas won the fight by unanimous decision, with all three judges awarding him a 117–110 scorecard. He sustained three different cuts from head clashes. Manzanilla was twice deducted a point for hitting on the break. Vargas landed 207 of 719 total punches (28.8%) while Manzanilla landed 93 of 581 total punches (16%).

Vargas vs. Kameda
Vargas made his third title defense against the one-time WBO bantamweight champion Tomoki Kameda on 13 July 2019 at the Dignity Health Sports Park in Carson, California. Kameda had earned his right to challenge with a decision victory over Abigail Medina to capture the WBC interim super bantamweight championship. The bout was headlined a DAZN broadcast card. Vargas justified his role as the betting favorite, Vargas justified his role as the betting favorite, as he won the fight by unanimous decision. All three judges scored the fight 117–110 in his favor. Vargas out-landed Kameda 173 to 133 in total punches, but only 122 to 120 in power punches.

WBC featherweight champion

Vargas vs. Baez 
On 13 August, the WBC declared Vargas their super bantamweight champion-in-recess, as he suffered a broken leg in training which left him unable to defend for the remainder of the year. During this year, Vargas also departed from Golden Boy Promotions and signed with Premier Boxing Champions. For his first fight under the PBC banner, Vargas was booked to face Leonardo Baez. The fight took place on 6 November 2021, on the Canelo Álvarez vs. Caleb Plant undercard. He won the fight by unanimous decision, with one scorecard of 99–91 and two scorecards of 100–90.

Vargas vs. Magsayo 
On 9 March 2022, it was announced that Vargas would challenge the reigning WBC featherweight champion Mark Magsayo in what was the champion's first title defense. Magsayo was ranked #2 by The Ring at featherweight. The fight was officially announced for 9 July 2022. It headlined a It headlined a Showtime card which took place at the Alamodome in San Antonio, Texas. Despite his role as the challenger, Vargas entered the fight as the favorite, with most odds-makers having him Magsayo a +105 underdog. He won the fight by split decision. Two of the judges scored the fight 115–112 in his favor, while the third judge scored the bout 114–113 for Magsayo. Vargas was knocked down with a counter right in the ninth round, but his opponent failed to capitalize on it. He landed 196 of 687 total punches (29%) and 135 of 339 power punches (40%), compared to Magsayo's 132 total punches and 92 power punches.

Vargas vs. Foster 
On 24 August 2022, Vargas received permission from the WBC to enter into negotiations for a title unification bout with the reigning WBA "Super" featherweight champion Leo Santa Cruz. As Vargas and Santa Cruz failed to reach an agreement, Vargas was instead permitted by the WBC to move up a weight class and face O'Shaquie Foster for the vacant WBC super featherweight title. The fight took place on 11 February 2023, at the Alamodome in San Antonio, Texas. Vargas suffered the first loss of his professional career, as Foster won the fight by unanimous decision, with scores of 116–112, 117–111 and 119–109. He struggled to compete at his usual range and was only able to land 101 total punches through the twelve rounds, 43 less than Foster, and 66 power punches, 21 less than Foster.

Professional boxing record

See also
List of world super-bantamweight boxing champions
List of world featherweight boxing champions
List of Mexican boxing world champions

References

External links

Rey Vargas - Profile, News Archive & Current Rankings at Box.Live

1990 births
Living people
People from Otumba
Mexican male boxers
Boxers from the State of Mexico
World Boxing Council champions
World super-bantamweight boxing champions
World featherweight boxing champions